Tour of Al Zubarah is a men's four-days cycle race which takes place in Zubarah, Qatar and was rated by the UCI as 2.2 and forms part of the UCI Asia Tour. It was inaugurated on December 4, 2013.

Overall winners

Official page
http://www.zubarahtour.com/

References

Cycle races in Qatar